Wibout Jolles (born 10 January 1954) is a Dutch sports shooter. He competed in the mixed 25 metre rapid fire pistol event at the 1980 Summer Olympics.

References

1954 births
Living people
Dutch male sport shooters
Olympic shooters of the Netherlands
Shooters at the 1980 Summer Olympics
Sportspeople from The Hague